Events from the year 1831 in Canada.

Incumbents
Monarch: William IV

Federal government
Parliament of Lower Canada: 14th (starting January 21)
Parliament of Upper Canada: 11th (starting January 7)

Governors
Governor of the Canadas: James Kempt
Governor of New Brunswick: Howard Douglas
Governor of Nova Scotia: Thomas Nickleson Jeffery
Civil Governor of Newfoundland: Thomas John Cochrane
Governor of Prince Edward Island: John Ready

Events
A charter for a railway, from La Prairie, Quebec to St. John's, is granted; it will be the first railway in Canada.
Massive Patriote campaign to petition the king for reforms.
Male Jews were extended full political and religious rights.
Many African-Canadians were protesting at the time about voting rights, although these weren't granted to them until 7 years later.

Births
February 1 – Francis Evans Cornish, politician (died 1878)
February 14 – Camille Lefebvre (died 1895)
March 18 – David Mills, politician, author, poet and jurist (died 1903)
April 17 – John Macoun, naturalist (died 1920)
May 1 – Emily Stowe, first female doctor to practice in Canada and women's rights and suffrage activist (died 1903)
May 17 – Robert Machray, clergyman, missionary and first Primate of the Church of England in Canada (died 1904)
July 30 – Simon Hugh Holmes, publisher, lawyer, politician and Premier of Nova Scotia (died 1919)
August 16 – John Jones Ross, politician and Premier of Quebec (died 1901)

Deaths
 October 26 : Jacques Labrie, physician and politician

References 

 
Canada
Years of the 19th century in Canada
1831 in North America